Social Democratic Students (SONK) is the student organisation of the Social Democratic Party of Finland.

References

External links 
 Official homepage of SONK 

Social Democratic Party of Finland
Student wings of social democratic parties
Student wings of political parties in Finland